A Farm (Spanish: Una granja) is an oil on panel painting by Flemish painter Joos de Momper. 

The work has been credited as collaboration between de Momper and Jan Brueghel the Elder. The painting is kept in the Museum of Prado in Madrid.

References

Further reading
 Salas, Xavier de, Museo del Prado. Catálogo de las pinturas, Museo del Prado, Madrid, 1972.
 Díaz Padrón, Matías, Museo del Prado: catálogo de pinturas. Escuela flamenca, Museo del Prado; Patrimonio Nacional de Museos, Madrid, 1975, pp. 200.
 Díaz Padrón, Matías, La Escuela Flamenca del Siglo XVII, Ediciones Alfiz, Madrid, 1983, pp. 67.
 Museo Nacional del Prado, Museo del Prado. Catálogo de las pinturas, Museo del Prado, Madrid, 1985, pp. 431.
 Museo Nacional del Prado, Museo del Prado: inventario general de pinturas (I) La Colección Real, Museo del Prado, Espasa Calpe, Madrid, 1990, pp. nº1312.
 Ayala Mallory, Nina, La pintura flamenca del siglo XVII, Alianza editorial, Madrid, 1995, pp. 200/ lám.70.
 Díaz Padrón, Matías, El siglo de Rubens en el Museo del Prado: catálogo razonado, Prensa Ibérica, Barcelona, 1996, pp. 756.
 Martínez Leiva, Gloria. Rodríguez Rebollo, Angel, El inventario del Alcázar de Madrid de 1666. Felipe IV y su colección artística., Consejo Superior de Investigaciones Científicas, Madrid, 2015, pp. 353 nº 341.

External links
Una granja at the Museum of Prado

17th-century paintings
Paintings of the Museo del Prado by Flemish artists
Landscape paintings
Paintings by Joos de Momper